Josip Lukunić (born 27 March 1981) is a Croatian football midfielder.

References

1981 births
Living people
Sportspeople from Šibenik
Association football midfielders
Croatian footballers
NK Croatia Sesvete players
HNK Šibenik players
HNK Rijeka players
NK Pomorac 1921 players
NK Karlovac players
Croatian Football League players
First Football League (Croatia) players